Luther is an unincorporated community in Carbon County, Montana, United States. Luther lies on Montana Highway 78, southeast of Roscoe and northwest of Red Lodge.

Luther was originally called Linley. Its first post office was established on March 12, 1902 with Walter R. Linley as the postmaster, and a ZIP code of 59068. The name was officially changed to "Luther" on March 4, 1907, with Grace R. Luther named as postmaster. On July 22, 1983, the post office was closed, and Luther is now serviced out of Red Lodge.

Demographics

References

Unincorporated communities in Carbon County, Montana
Unincorporated communities in Montana
Billings metropolitan area